Eliška Křenková (born 31 January 1990 in Prague) is a Czech film and television actress.  Křenková's film credits include Winter Flies, A Certain Kind of Silence and Princess Lost in Time.  Her television credits include Wasteland, Specialisté and Sever.

Filmography

References

External links

1990 births
Living people
Czech film actresses
Actresses from Prague
21st-century Czech actresses
Czech television actresses
Academy of Performing Arts in Prague alumni
Czech Lion Awards winners